Robert Bell Cotton (June 8, 1859 - 1917) was a Democratic member of the Mississippi House of Representatives, representing Alcorn County, from 1911 until his death.

Biography 
Robert Bell Cotton was born on June 8, 1859, in Tippah County, Mississippi, to James Madison Cotton and Martha Ellen (Bell) Cotton. He married Eldora Wiggs in 1885. He was elected to the Mississippi House of Representatives, representing Alcorn County, in 1911 in a special election to choose the successor of W. T. Bennet and served in the 1911 session. He was re-elected to the House in 1911 and 1915. He was a Democrat. He died in Alcorn County, Mississippi, in 1917, and was replaced by J. R. Hill.

References 

1859 births
1917 deaths
Democratic Party members of the Mississippi House of Representatives
People from Tippah County, Mississippi
People from Alcorn County, Mississippi